Tamás Kiss (born 27 September 1979 in Szekszárd) is a Hungarian football player who currently plays for Paksi SE.

References
Paksi FC Official Website
HLSZ

1979 births
Living people
People from Szekszárd
Hungarian footballers
Association football midfielders
Szekszárdi UFC footballers
Hévíz FC footballers
Paksi FC players
Nemzeti Bajnokság I players
Sportspeople from Tolna County